Just Friends is a 2005 romantic comedy film starring Ryan Reynolds and Amy Smart.

Just Friends may also refer to:

Film and television 
 Just Friends (1993 film), a Belgian-Dutch film directed by Marc-Henri Wajnberg
 Just Friends? (2009 film), a 2009 South Korean short film directed by Kim Jho Kwang-soo
 Just Friends (2018 film), a 2018 Dutch film, original title Gewoon Vrienden, directed by Ellen Smit
 "Just Friends" (Degrassi High), an episode of Degrassi High
 "Just Friends" (Life with Derek), an episode of Life with Derek
  Just Friends (TV series), a 1979 American sitcom

Music

Albums 
 Just Friends (Joe Temperley and Jimmy Knepper album), 1978
 Just Friends (soundtrack), a soundtrack album from the 2005 film
 Just Friends (Rick Haydon and John Pizzarelli album), 2006
 Just Friends (Zoot Sims and Harry Edison album), 1980
 Just Friends, a 1989 album by Oliver Jones
 Just Friends, a 1989 album by Helen Merrill
 Just Friends (Buddy Tate, Nat Simkins and Houston Person album), 1992
 Riddim Driven: Just Friends, a 2002 compilation album

Songs 
 "Just Friends" (Danny! song), 2009
 "Just Friends" (Hayden James song), 2018
 "Just Friends" (John Klenner and Sam M. Lewis song), 1931
 "Just Friends (Sunny)", a 1999 song by Musiq Soulchild
 "Just Friends", a song by Amy Winehouse from Back to Black
 "Just Friends", a song by Gavin DeGraw from Chariot
 "Just Friends", a song by the Jonas Brothers from Jonas Brothers
 "Just Friends", a song by Nine Black Alps from Everything Is
 "Just Friends", a song by Vanessa Williams from The Real Thing
 "Just Friends", a song by Virginia to Vegas from Hartland St.
 "Just Friends", a song by Why Don't We

Artists 
 Just Friends (band), an American funk rock band

See also 
 Just Between Friends (album), a 2008 album by saxophonist Houston Person and bassist Ron Carter
 Just Between Friends (soundtrack)
 Just Good Friends (disambiguation)
 Friend zone, a strictly platonic relationship in which one partner, but not the other, wishes to enter into a strong and close romantic relationship
 Friends (disambiguation)
 Friendship, a form of interpersonal relationship